Harry Hart "Pat" Frank  (May 5, 1908 – October 12, 1964) was an American writer, newspaperman, and government consultant. Frank's best known work is the 1959 Alas, Babylon, and Forbidden Area.

Biography
Frank was born in Chicago in 1908. He was known by the nickname Pat throughout his life. He was a journalist and information handler for several newspapers, agencies, and government bureaus. During his early career, he lived mainly in New York City, Washington, and overseas during World War II. He worked for the Office of War Information and was a correspondent in Italy, Austria, Germany, and Turkey. He died at age 56 of acute pancreatitis on October 12, 1964, in Atlantic Beach, Florida, just east of Jacksonville.

Works

Nearly all men are sterile in Mr. Adam (1946), Frank's first published work. His other novels include Hold Back the Night, An Affair of State, and Forbidden Area.

Frank's experiences reporting on the Korean War are described in his autobiographical travelogue The Long Way Round and influenced Hold Back the Night.

Frank wrote his most popular work, the post-apocalyptic novel Alas, Babylon, while living in Tangerine, Florida, on Lake Beauclaire near Mount Dora. Vivian Owens, an author familiar with local history, states that "Pistolville", the name Frank gave to an area near Fort Repose in the novel, was in fact a location situated between the southern edge of Mount Dora to its north and Tangerine to its south. According to Owens, greater Mount Dora was intended by Frank to be the model for his semi-fictional Fort Repose.

Frank also wrote a 160-page non-fiction book, How To Survive the H Bomb And Why (1962).

Frank's fiction provided the basis for several TV dramas and two feature films, the 1956 drama Hold Back the Night and Howard Hawks' 1964 comedy Man's Favorite Sport? (based on Frank's short story "The Girl Who Almost Got Away"). His novel Forbidden Area was adapted by Rod Serling for the 1957 debut episode of the television anthology series Playhouse 90, starring Charlton Heston. An April 3, 1960 episode of Playhouse 90 featured Alas, Babylon, starring Don Murray and Dana Andrews.

In addition, he wrote one original screenplay, for the 1963 Bay of Pigs-inspired drama, We Shall Return.

Frank received the American Heritage Foundation Award in 1961.

Bibliography

 Mr. Adam (1946)
 An Affair of State (1948)
 Hold Back the Night (1951)
 The Long Way Round (1953)
 Forbidden Area (1956) (also published as Seven Days to Never)
 Alas, Babylon (1959)
 How to Survive the H-Bomb...and Why (1962)

See also
 Fallout shelter
 Retreat (survivalism)
 Survivalism
 United States civil defense

References

Further reading
 Owens, Vivian W. The Mount Dorans: African American History Notes of a Florida Town. Waynesboro, VA: Eschar Publications, 2000. .

External links
 

 
 A Guide to the Pat Frank Papers, held at George A. Smathers Libraries of the University of Florida

1908 births
1964 deaths
20th-century American male writers
20th-century American novelists
American male novelists
American science fiction writers
Deaths from pancreatitis
Novelists from Florida
People of the United States Office of War Information
People from Atlantic Beach, Florida
People from Orange County, Florida
Survivalists
University of Florida alumni
20th-century pseudonymous writers